Newtral is the fifth studio album by Ikimono-gakari, released in Japan on February 29, 2012.  It has reached number one on the Oricon Weekly charts, and became the group's fourth consecutive number-one album.

Release 
The album was released in Japan on February 29, 2012 in two editions.  The regular edition (ESCL-3829), had for its first  pressings an Ikimono card #028 and an entry form for additional prizes. The limited edition (ESCL-3827/8) included a second CD with live performances from 2009-2011, a set of album themed postcards titled Newseum ?, and special box packaging to display pictures of the three members.

The release day was coincident with vocalist Kiyoe Yoshioka's leap day (February 29) birthday.  To celebrate the event, the group held a free event at Roppongi Hills Arena, and it was also streamed live on Nico Nico Douga.

Tie-ins 
Tie-ins to media and commercial products.
 "Aruite Ikou" was the theme song of a TBS Drama "ランナウェイ〜愛する君のために" (Runaway - For You, the Person Who I Love) that aired in October–December 2011.
 "Warattetainda" was used as a commercial song for the Nissan Serena in the second half of 2011.
 "Itsudatte Bokura Wa" was used as a commercial song for You Can in January 2012.
 "Kiss Kiss Bang Bang" was a commercial song for Sixteen Tea in February 2012.
 "New World Music" was used in the TV news show "Mezamashi TV" in April 2011.

Track list
Source for romanized title tracks: Jpopasia.com Source for track information: Ikimonogakari official site English translations are unofficial.

 The song is read as "Hoshi" meaning "Star" but uses the kanji 地球 "Chikyuu" meaning "The Earth".

Release history

Oricon Chart (Japan)

References

External links
 

2012 albums
Ikimono-gakari albums